Aksu is a village in the central district of Hakkâri Province in Turkey. The village is populated by Kurds of the Mamxûran tribe and had a population of 30 in 2022.

The six hamlets of Atbaşı, Çığır, Çiçekli, Duran, Güngören and Oymak are attached to the village.

Population 
Population history from 2007 to 2022:

References 

Kurdish settlements in Hakkâri Province
Villages in Hakkâri District